The Oranga Tamariki Act 1989 or Children's and Young People's Well-being Act 1989 (titled the Children, Young Persons, and Their Families Act 1989 prior to 14 July 2017) is an Act of the New Zealand Parliament that was passed in 1989. The Act's main purpose is to "promote the well-being of children, young persons, and their families and family groups." In June 2017, the New Zealand Parliament passed amendment legislation renaming the bill the Oranga Tamariki Act 1989.

Key provisions
Considered to be groundbreaking legislation at the time, the Act introduced the Family Group Conference (FGC) as a means of making decisions about a child or young person that did not involve a Court Hearing. The Act set out procedures for the removal of abused children from their parent's care, making the best interests of the child the first consideration. It also set out procedures for dealing with youth offenders, making arrest and imprisonment interventions of last resort. Although Police initially feared those restrictive provisions on their powers would cause problems, practical experience has not borne out those fears. The Act also provided for a Commissioner for Children.

The Act determines how the state intervenes to protect children from abuse and neglect, and to prevent and address child and youth offending. It represents how well our society cares for and supports our children and young people. The Act introduced principles that changed the way decisions were made about children and young people, enabling family to become partners in the decision-making process to resolve family issues.

Fundamental to the Act was the incorporation and inclusion of families throughout the process of making decisions in matters of care and protection of children and young people, and offending by young people. This was most clearly reflected in the extensive use of Family Group Conferences as the preferred method of operation, and in the use and involvement of family in meeting the needs of children and young people who had offended and/or who were the subject of care and protection actions. Generally, it was expected that families would provide for their members and solutions were to be sought within the family.

History
The Children, Young Persons, and Their Families Act 1989 was one of the significant social service reform legislation implemented by the Fourth Labor Government of New Zealand. It repealed the Children and Young Persons Act 1974, which had been introduced by the  Third Labor Government of New Zealand. 

When the Children, Young Persons and Their Families Act 1989 was introduced it was seen to be world-leading child welfare legislation. The Act impacts on the lives of thousands of children, young people and their families. The Act introduced major changes to the way decisions were made about children and young people who were victims of abuse and neglect or who broke the law, and placed New Zealand at the forefront of international legislative best practice.

In 2003, the Act was amended by the Children's Commissioner Act 2003, which replaced the previous Commissioner for Children with a new Office of the Children's Commissioner (OCC). The OCC was also designated as a Crown entity and tasked with promoting the United Nations Convention on the Rights of the Child (UNCRC).

In April 2007, the Ministry of Social Development called for submissions on a discussion document reviewing how the Act was working, with a view to making improvements.

In June 2017, the New Zealand Parliament passed the Children, Young Persons, and Their Families (Oranga Tamariki) Legislation Bill 2016, which amended the Children, Young Persons and Their Families Act 1989 by renaming it the Oranga Tamariki Act 1989 and specified that 17 year olds would be treated as adults by the justice system.

See also
Oranga Tamariki

Further reading

External links

Reference List 

Statutes of New Zealand
1989 in New Zealand law
Children's rights in New Zealand
Youth in New Zealand
Child abuse legislation
New Zealand family law